Barberis is a surname. Notable people with the surname include:

 Dominique Barbéris (born 1958), French novelist, author, and professor
 Mariolino Barberis (born 1949), Italian singer
 Sébastien Barberis (born 1972), Swiss retired footballer
 Stephano Barberis, Canadian music video director
 Umberto Barberis (born 1952), Swiss-Italian footballer and manager

Surnames of Italian origin